William Armstrong (born January 19, 1932, Gloucester, Massachusetts – January 2, 2000, Frazier Park, California) was an American television game show announcer and producer. He produced The Hollywood Squares for several years, and later was a business partner with Squares host Peter Marshall in a production company. He received two Emmy nominations as producer for Hollywood Squares.

Armstrong also co-produced and announced on Celebrity Sweepstakes and The Reel to Reel Picture Show. He was the announcer of KTLA's Liar's Club, a role he continued in its first year of syndication and returned to in 1988.

He was the executive producer of Matchmaker, for which he occasionally announced as well.

Credits
Celebrity Sweepstakes — announcer
Stumpers! — announcer
Liar's Club — host (1976-1977), announcer (1988)
Fantasy — announcer
The Reel to Reel Picture Show — announcer

References

External links

American game show hosts
Game show announcers
People from Gloucester, Massachusetts
1932 births
2000 deaths